The 1995–96 Slovenian Second League season started on 13 August 1995 and ended on 9 June 1996. Each team played a total of 29 matches. Jadran Dekani and Kočevje withdrew before the start of the season. Their places were taken by Železničar Maribor and Črnuče.

League standing

See also
1995–96 Slovenian PrvaLiga
1995–96 Slovenian Third League

References

External links
Football Association of Slovenia 

Slovenian Second League seasons
2
Slovenia